The Grumeti Game Reserve is found in Tanzania. It was established in 1993. This site is 411 km.

On the northwestern border of the famous Serengeti National Park, there is the Grumeti Game Reserve: a migration corridor for herds of animals that naturally pass through the area.

This is where it is easy to see the movement of huge herds of wildebeest and zebra and this describes the Serengeti/Mara ecology itself.

References

External links
 Grumeti Game Reserve in Serengeti ecosystem
 Serengeti Game Reserve

Protected areas of Tanzania
Protected areas established in 1993
1993 establishments in Tanzania